Nicholas Frank Lodolo (born February 5, 1998) is an American professional baseball pitcher for the Cincinnati Reds of Major League Baseball (MLB). He made his MLB debut in 2022.

Amateur career
Lodolo attended Damien High School in La Verne, California, and played for the school's baseball team as a pitcher. As a senior, he had a 8–2 win-loss record with a 1.97 earned run average (ERA), striking out 83 batters in 65 innings pitched. After his senior year, the Pittsburgh Pirates selected Lodolo with the 41st overall pick in the 2016 Major League Baseball draft. However, he did not sign and instead chose to fulfill his commitment to attend Texas Christian University (TCU) and play college baseball for the TCU Horned Frogs.

As a freshman at TCU in 2017, Lodolo appeared in 17 games (15 starts) where he compiled a 5–1 record with a 4.35 ERA. He was named to the All-Big 12 Second Team as well as to the All-Freshman Team. In 2018, as a sophomore, he went 7–4 with a 4.32 ERA, striking out 93 batters in 77 innings over 16 games (15 starts) and was named to the All-Big 12 Second Team once again. Prior to the 2019 season, Lodolo was named to the Preseason All-Big 12 Team. Lodolo finished his junior season with a 6–6 record and a 2.36 ERA, striking out 131 in 103 innings. He was named to the All-Big 12 First Team. In his college career, he was 18-11 with a 3.55 ERA in 258.2 innings, in which he struck out 296 batters and hit 34 batters.

Professional career
Lodolo was considered one of the top prospects for the 2019 Major League Baseball draft. He was selected by the Cincinnati Reds with the seventh overall pick. He signed for $5.43 million, and was assigned to the Billings Mustangs of the Rookie Advanced Pioneer League. After six starts with Billings, he was promoted to the Dayton Dragons of the Class A Midwest League in July. Following two starts with Dayton, Lodolo reached his innings limit, and was shut down for the remainder of the year. Over eight starts between Billings and Dayton, he pitched to a 0–1 record with a 2.45 ERA, striking out 30 in  innings.

Lodolo did not play a minor league game in 2020 due to the cancellation of the minor league season caused by the COVID-19 pandemic. To begin the 2021 season, he was assigned to the Chattanooga Lookouts of the Double-A South. He was named the league's Player of the Month in May after compiling a 1.01 ERA with 38 strikeouts and a 0.83 WHIP over  innings. On June 15, he was placed on the injured list due to a blister on a finger on his left hand, and was activated a few weeks later. That same month, Lodolo was selected to play in the All-Star Futures Game at Coors Field. Over ten starts with the Lookouts, he went 2–1 with a 1.84 ERA and 68 strikeouts over 44 innings. In early August, he was promoted to the Louisville Bats of the Triple-A East. He was placed back on the injured list in late August with a shoulder strain, and missed the remainder of the season. Over three starts with Louisville, Lodolo went 0-1 and gave up four earned runs and two walks while striking out ten over  innings.

On April 13, 2022, the Reds selected Lodolo's contract and promoted him to the major leagues. He made his MLB debut that day as the starting pitcher versus the Cleveland Guardians. Over four innings, he allowed five earned runs on seven hits (two home runs), three walks, and four strikeouts, taking the loss as the Reds fell 7-3. After three starts, he was placed on the injured list with a back strain. In 2022 he was 4-7 with a 3.66 ERA in 103.1 innings, and led the majors in hit batsmen, with 19.

References

External links

TCU Horned Frogs bio

1998 births
Living people
People from La Verne, California
Baseball players from California
Major League Baseball pitchers
Cincinnati Reds players
TCU Horned Frogs baseball players
Billings Mustangs players
Dayton Dragons players
Chattanooga Lookouts players
Louisville Bats players